The Right Man is a 1925 American silent drama film directed by Jack Harvey. It stars George Larkin and Mary Beth Milford.

Plot
As described in a film magazine review, Mrs. Hoyt is infatuated with Dergan, the managing editor of her husband’s newspaper. Dergan buys a hat similar to Hoyt’s and then calls on Mrs. Hoyt. Moha, faithful to his master, shoots at Dergan but kills another maan, a crook. Mrs. Hoyt hides the hat. Tip O’Neil, a reporter, is aware of Dergan’s real villainy and the fact that Dergan is “playing” for the newspaper stock which Mrs. Hoyt owns. So when Dergan tries to win the affection of Mary Burton, who also works in the office. Tip gets busy and frustrates Dergan’s every move. Dergan finally gets shot by Moha when he attempts to take the stock certificates from Mrs. Hoyt. Mary and Tip are happy as they drive away from the Hoyt residence with  Denny, Tip’s pal, as the chauffeur.

Cast
 George Larkin as Tip O'Neil
 Mary Beth Milford as Mary Burton
 Jerome La Grasse as Bruce Dergan
 Ollie Kirby as Mrs. Hoyt
 Roy Laidlaw as James J. Hoyt
 Milburn Morante as Denny O’Reilly, a Houseboy
 Max Bennett as Moha, a servant
 Milton J. Fahrney as City Editor

References

External links
The Right Man at the Internet Movie Database

1925 films
American silent feature films
Silent American drama films
1925 drama films
Films directed by Jack Harvey
American black-and-white films
Rayart Pictures films
1920s American films